Dab ( Dab ), is a village and union council of Mianwali District in the Punjab province of Pakistan. The Union Council is an administrative subdivision of Piplan Tehsil.

References

Union councils of Mianwali District